Ceint railway station was a station in Anglesey, Wales situated on the Red Wharf Bay branch line between Holland Arms and Benllech. It was the first station after the line branched from the main Anglesey Central Railway. Opening in 1908 it was a very simple station with only one short  platform on the Up (south-east) side and a wooden waiting hut. It was an unstaffed request stop with neither goods yard nor sidings. Ordnance Survey maps show that this, along with the station next on the line Rhyd-y-Saint are two of the most remote on the island.

When the line closed to passengers in 1930  the station building was removed. Although the tracks were taken up in 1953 the platform itself is still visible from a nearby road bridge.

References

Further reading

Disused railway stations in Anglesey
Railway stations in Great Britain opened in 1908
Railway stations in Great Britain closed in 1930
Llanddyfnan
Former London and North Western Railway stations
1908 establishments in Wales
1930 disestablishments in Wales